Antoni Leszczewicz (1890, Abramaǔščyna (now Smarhon district of Belarus) –1943) was a Polish-Belarusian Marian Father and Roman Catholic priest. He was a missionary in China for two decades in the interwar period. 

He is one of the 108 Martyrs of World War II who was burned alive with a group of parishioners by the Nazis in Belarus in 1943. He was beatified by Pope John Paul II in the 1990s.

References

1890 births
1943 deaths
People from Sventsyansky Uyezd
People from Smarhon’ District
20th-century Polish Roman Catholic priests
Polish beatified people
Roman Catholic missionaries in China
20th-century Roman Catholic martyrs